Moyenne-Sido is a locality in the prefecture of Ouham, in the Central African Republic.

Geography and climate 

The climate is tropical savanna climate (Köppen climate classification Aw).
The locality is located on the right bank of the Grande Sido river, which constitutes the border with the Republic of Chad, opposite the Chadian city of Sido or Nadili. It is crossed by the RN4 national road which links Kabo (61 km to the south), then Damara and beyond Bangui into Chad.

History 
The city fell to the Seleka on March 1, 2013. It was recaptured by government forces on 19 April 2021.

References 

Sub-prefectures of the Central African Republic
Populated places in Ouham-Fafa